Atomic Playboys is the first studio album by guitarist Steve Stevens, released in 1989 through Warner Bros. Records; a remastered edition containing two bonus tracks was reissued on August 5, 2013 through Rock Candy Records. The album reached No. 119 on the U.S. Billboard 200 chart. The cover art was done by surrealist artist H.R. Giger, who designed the Xenomorph creature in the Alien film series.

Atomic Playboys was also the name of Stevens' band at the time, which was only meant to be a one-album effort upon him being signed to Warner Bros. In a 2001 interview, when asked about the possibly of reforming the group, Stevens replied: "Absolutely not. That group was a very expensive hobby".

Track listing

Personnel

Steve Stevens – lead vocals (track 9), guitar, bass (except track 1), production
Perry McCarty – lead vocals
Phil Ashley – keyboard, preamplifier
Thommy Price – drums (except tracks 4, 8)
Anton Fig – drums (tracks 4, 8)
Kasim Sulton – bass (track 1)
Chris Botti – horn (track 2), horn arrangement (track 2)
Kent Smith – horn (track 2), horn arrangement (track 2)
Mike Davis – horn (track 2)
Andy Snitzer – horn (track 2)
Daniel Wilensky – horn (track 2)
Paul Winger – background vocals
Nate Winger – background vocals
Paulette Brown – background vocals (tracks 2, 9)
Bunny Hull – background vocals (track 2)
Fiona – background vocals (track 4)
Dave Wittman – engineering, mixing
Debi Cornish – engineering
Danny Mormando – engineering
Joel Stoner – engineering
Jeff DeMorris – engineering
John Kubick – digital editing
Ted Jensen – mastering
Beau Hill – background vocals, production
Ted Templeman – executive production

Chart performance

In popular culture
The title track was used by Australian television network The Nine Network for the closing credits of their Formula One coverage throughout the early 1990s
The title track features a quote by William H. P. Blandy, who originally said "I am not an atomic playboy" in response to the 1946 atomic bomb tests at Bikini Atoll
"Power of Suggestion" was featured in the 1994 film Ace Ventura: Pet Detective

References

Steve Stevens albums
1989 debut albums
Warner Records albums
Albums produced by Ted Templeman
Albums produced by Beau Hill
Albums with cover art by H. R. Giger